Carthago Airport  is an airport serving Carthago, located in the Red Sea state in Sudan.

It has two faintly marked sand runways.

References

External links
 

Airports in Sudan
Red Sea (state)